The following is a list of notable deaths in March 1990.

Entries for each day are listed alphabetically by surname. A typical entry lists information in the following sequence:
 Name, age, country of citizenship at birth, subsequent country of citizenship (if applicable), reason for notability, cause of death (if known), and reference.

March 1990

1
Desmond Brain, 80, Australian cricketer.
Max Bulla, 84, Austrian racing cyclist.
Ben Hill Griffin, Jr., 79, American businessman and politician.
Dainin Katagiri, 62, Japanese-American Zen master, cancer.

2
Arthur Fleischmann, 93, Czech-British sculptor.
Shakey Jake Harris, 68, American musician.
Reg Saunders, 69, Aboriginal Australian Army officer.
Shin Shalom, 85, Israeli writer.

3
Roberto Bertol, 72, Spanish football player.
Gérard Blitz, 78, Belgian entrepreneur.
William D. Dunham, 70, American general and flying ace during World War II.
Frans Goedhart, 86, Dutch politician and journalist.
Louis Page, 84, French cinematographer.
Charlotte Moore Sitterly, 91, American astronomer, heart failure.

4
Abraham Bernstein, 71, American politician.
Hank Gathers, 23, American basketball player, ventricular tachycardia.
Konstantin Konstantinovich Kokkinaki, 79, Soviet fighter and test pilot.
Vasily Margelov, 81, Soviet general.
Heinz Schnackertz, 78, German cinematographer.
Harry Worthington, 98, American Olympic track and field athlete (1912).

5
Albano, 67, Portuguese footballer.
Edmund Conen, 75, German football player.
Mala, 47, Pakistani singer.
Timothy Mason, 50, English marxist historian of Nazi Germany, suicide.
Gary Merrill, 74, American actor (All About Eve), lung cancer.
Hans Christian Nielsen, 61, Danish footballer.
Gina Pane, 50, French artist.
Gloria Carter Spann, 63, American motorcyclist, sister of Jimmy Carter, pancreatic cancer.
Peter Adolf Thiessen, 90, German chemist.
Karel Thijs, 71, Belgian racing cyclist.
William Appleman Williams, 68, American historian.

6
Friedrich Hielscher, 87, German theologian.
Taro Kagawa, 67, Japanese footballer.
E. T. Klassen, 81, United States Postmaster General.
Egill Knutzen, 75, Norwegian Olympic fencer (1936, 1948, 1952).
Adam Papée, 94, Polish fencer and Olympic medalist.
William Raborn, 84, American intelligence officer, Director of Central Intelligence (1965–1966).
Joe Sewell, 91, American baseball player.
Julian Spence, 60, American football player.
Earl T. Wagner, 81, American politician, member of the U.S. House of Representatives (1949–1951).

7
Claude Arrieu, 86, French composer.
Shuddhananda Bharati, 92, Indian religious philosopher.
Shenork I Kaloustian of Constantinople, 76, Soviet Armenian Patriarch of Constantinople (since 1963).
Pancho Córdova, 73, Mexican actor, screenwriter and film director.
Çetin Emeç, 54-55, Turkish journalist, shot.
Ruth Glass, 77, German-British sociologist and urban planner.
Mordecai Gorelik, 90, Russian-American theatrical designer, cancer.
Jay Lovestone, 92, Russian-American political activist.
Luís Carlos Prestes, 92, Brazilian politician, heart attack.
Jacobus Gideon Nel Strauss, 89, South African politician.
Salvatore Tripoli, 85, American boxer and Olympic medalist.
Mihály Tóth, 63, Hungarian football player.
Carl A. Wirtanen, 79, American astronomer.

8
Erkki Aaltonen, 79, Finnish composer.
Erich Hohagen, 75, German general and flying ace during World War II.
Karin Kavli, 83, Swedish actress.
Charles Krüger, 93, Luxembourgian football player.
Jack Lindsay, 89, Australian-British writer.
John Ben Shepperd, 74, American politician, cancer.
Hein van Breenen, 60, Dutch racing cyclist.

9
Georgios Costakis, 76, Soviet collector of Russian art.
Abraham Solomon Halkin, 86, Russian-American-Israeli historian, pneumonia.
Giorgos Joannides, 67, Greek-born American intelligence officer.
Martial Singher, 85, French opera singer.
Lou Vedder, 92, American football player.

10
Tseng Kwong Chi, 39, Hong Kong-American photographer, AIDS.
B. R. Deodhar, 88, Indian singer.
Michael Stewart, Baron Stewart of Fulham, 83, British politician.
Pat McDonald, 68, Australian actress, pancreatic cancer.
Harro Ran, 52, Dutch water polo player.
Otto Schuhart, 80, German U-boat commander during War II.
Darbara Singh, 74, Indian politician.
Lance Tingay, 74, British sports journalist, heart attack.
Reg Wright, 84, Australian politician.

11
Dan Archibong, 46, Nigerian soldier and politician, traffic collision.
Muriel Dickson, 86, Scottish soprano.
Pratul Chandra Gupta, 80, Indian historian.
Dean Horrix, 28, English footballer, traffic collision.
Edward Grady Partin, 66, American trade unionist.
Oronzo Pugliese, 79, Italian football manager.
Roy Schalk, 81, American baseball player.

12
Bruce Barnes, 80, American tennis player.
Rie de Balbian Verster-Bolderheij, 100, Dutch painter.
Wallace Breem, 63, British author.
Lamberto Cesari, 79, Italian-American mathematician.
Jane Grigson, 61, English cookbook writer, cervical cancer.
Eugene V. Klein, 69, American businessman.
Rosamond Lehmann, 89, English novelist.
Walter Orr Roberts, 74, American atmospheric scientist and astronomer, cancer.
Alf Sherwood, 66, Welsh footballer, heart attack.
Philippe Soupault, 92, French writer.
Harry South, 60, English musician.

13
Bruno Bettelheim, 86, Austrian-American psychologist, suicide by asphyxiation.
Hugh Cholmondeley, 6th Marquess of Cholmondeley, 70, British hereditary peer.
Albert De Cleyn, 72, Belgian football player.
Ernst Goldenbaum, 91, German politician.
Graham Martin, 77, American diplomat.
Karl Münchinger, 74, German conductor.
Irina Aleksandrovna Ovtchinnikova, 85, Russian-British anthropologist.
Gottfried Weimann, 82, German Olympic javelin thrower (1932, 1936).

14
Robert H. Bahmer, 85, American archivist.
Wilhelm Baumann, 77, German handball player.
Pete Close, 52, American Olympic runner (1960).
Richard Cooper, 44, English cricketer.
Harold Medina, 102, American judge.
Yuri Sokolov, 29, Soviet Olympic judoka (1988) and criminal, killed.
Aubrey Wisberg, 80, British-American filmmaker, cancer.

15
Farzad Bazoft, 31, Iranian-British journalist and alledged spy, execution by hanging.
José Antonio Bottiroli, 70, Argentine composer.
Jim Ede, 94, British art collector.
Loleta Fyan, 95, American librarian.
Tom Harmon, 70, American football player.
Mykola Makhynia, 77, Soviet and Ukrainian football player and coach.

16
Ernst Bacon, 91, American composer.
Wolfgang Clemen, 81, German literary scholar.
Fritz Ewert, 53, German footballer.
James Frank Gilliam, 75, American classical scholar.
Angus Scott, 62, British track and field athlete and Olympian.

17
Capucine, 62, French model and actress (The Pink Panther, What's New Pussycat?), suicide by jumping.
Samuel H. Friedman, 93, American journalist and labor union activist, pneumonia.
Ric Grech, 44, British musician, liver failure.
Nanette Guilford, 86, American opera singer, gastroenteritis.
Mohamed Latif, 80, Egyptian football player.
Jack Noren, 60, American drummer.
Rose Marie Pangborn, 57-58, American food scientist, cancer.
Carmelo Samonà, 64, Italian academic.

18
Robin Harris, 36, American comedian and actor, heart attack.
Bob Katter, Sr., 71, Australian politician.
Charles Phelps Smyth, 95, American chemist.
Eileen Soper, 84, English artist.
Zacarias, 56, Brazilian actor.

19
Oyinkan Abayomi, 93, Nigerian activist.
Tiny Brauer, 80, American actor.
James H. R. Cromwell, 93, American diplomat.
Wilhelm Flügge, 86, German engineer.
Leopold Neumer, 71, Austrian football player.
Oulaya, 53, Tunisian singer and actress.
Andrew Wood, 24, American singer, heroin overdose.

20
Jason Boe, 61, American politician.
Maurice Cloche, 82, French filmmaker, Parkinson's disease.
Kenneth Mather, 78, British geneticist, heart attack.
Wilhelm Neef, 74, German conductor.
Victor Rothschild, 3rd Baron Rothschild, 79, British banker and intelligence officer.
Lev Yashin, 60, Soviet footballer, stomach cancer.

21
Dessie Cullinane, 70, Irish footballer.
Allan Roberts, 46, British politician, cancer.
Mohammad Shahiduddin, 67, Bangladeshi freedom fighter and politician.
Edward Wojda, 48, Polish wrestler and Olympian.
Rayburn Wright, 67, American trombonist, composer, and conductor, cancer.

22
Gerald Bull, 62, Canadian military engineer, shot.
Maurice Fleuret, 57, French composer.
Robert Karplus, 63, Austrian-American theoretical physicist.
Bernardo Jaramillo Ossa, 33, Colombian communist politician, homicide.
Geoffrey Ostergaard, 63, British political scientist, leukemia.
Cornelius A. Pickett, 87, American politician.

23
John Dexter, 64, English theatre director.
René Enríquez, 56, Nicaraguan-American actor, AIDS.
John Jardine, 54, American gridiron football player, heart condition.
Al Sears, 80, American saxophonist.
Leongino Unzaim, 64, Paraguayan football player.

24
Ray Goulding, 68, American comedian, kidney failure.
Jennie Lee, 61, American stripteaser, cancer.
John Louis Morkovsky, 80, American Roman Catholic prelate, stroke.
Alice Sapritch, 73, French actress, cancer.
An Wang, 70, Chinese-American computer engineer, cancer.

25
Len Astill, 73, English footballer.
Karl Brown, 93, American filmmaker.
George Clayden, 86, Australian footballer.
Carl Emmermann, 75, German U-boat commander during World War II.
David Evans, 56, English cricket player.
Bertil Linde, 83, Swedish ice hockey player and Olympic medalist.
Charles Lucet, 79, French diplomat.

26
Chet Brewer, 83, American baseball player.
Tris Coffin, 80, American actor, lung cancer.
Halston, 57, American fashion designer, AIDS.
Brūno Kalniņš, 90, Russian-Swedish politician.
Michel Mirowski, 65, Polish-born American physician, multiple myeloma.
Maniben Patel, 86, Indian independence activist and politician.
Alan Solem, 58, American malacologist.

27
Percy Beard, 82, American track and field athlete and Olympic medalist.
Václav Bubník, 64, Czechoslovak ice hockey player.
Marilyn Buferd, 65, American actress, pancreatic cancer.
Alfred Earle, 82, British RAF officer.
Colin Jamieson, 66, Australian politician.
František Kopečný, 80, Czechoslovak linguist.
Ray Kuka, 68, American basketball player.
Lester James Maitland, 91, American aviator.

28
George Arthur, 65, Australian football player.
Gino Cappello, 69, Italian footballer.
Thomas Cree, 75, Australian Olympic rower (1936).
Henry Hecksher, 79, American intelligence officer, Parkinson's disease.
Johnny Neun, 89, American baseball player, pancreatic cancer.
Kurt Scharf, 87, German Lutheran prelate.
Helene Whitney, 75, American actress, pneumonia.

29
Adoor Bhasi, 63, Indian actor and film director, diabetes.
Barbara Baer Capitman, 69, American community activist, heart failure.
Joseph Hilger, 86-87, Luxembourgian Olympic runner (1924).
Phil Masi, 74, American baseball player.
Alain Oulman, 61, Portuguese songwriter.
Archie Strimel, 71, American football player.

30
Thea Bowman, 52, American Roman Catholic evangelist, cancer.
Harry Bridges, 88, Australian-American unionist.
Edvin Hansen, 70, Danish footballer.
Joseph O. Hirschfelder, 78, American nuclear physicist.
Eberhard Klagemann, 85, German film producer.
Vladimir Stolnikov, 56, Soviet boxer.

31
Piera Aulagnier, 66, French psychologist, cancer.
Pierre Destailles, 80, French film, stage and television actor.
John Hawkes, 90, Australian tennis player.
Horace Hazell, 80, English cricket player.
Knut Ansgar Nelson, 83, Danish-Swedish Roman Catholic prelate.
Heinz-Günter Wittmann, 63, German biochemist.

References 

1990-03
 03